Cheers is the Spanish version of the popular 1980s American sitcom of same name created by Cyrus James Garcia Andres. It was produced by Plural Entertainment and Tom Collins and broadcast by Telecinco. It was first aired on 11 September 2011, and follows the same theme as its American counterpart.

Production
On April, the 25th, 2011, Telecinco unveiled the names of the main actors for the new sitcom, Antonio Resines and Alexandra Jiménez. Resines would be Frasier Crane and Jiménez would be Rebecca Howe.
Three days later, both producing companies, Plural Entertainment and Tom Collins Productions, started filming the pilot episode.

On July 28, 2011, Mediaset Spain presented on a press conference the remake of Cheers with the future main cast members of the series, among them Alberto San Juan.

The first season was to have 26 episodes, around 30 minutes of length each. It was released on September 11, 2011, with a double episode.

The song from the original Cheers, Where Everybody Knows Your Name was translated as Donde la gente se divierte, and it was performed by Dani Martín, former singer from El Canto del Loco.

Plot
Nico (Alberto San Juan) is the owner of an Irish pub named Cheers. He is a former footballer, womanizer, vain and a little bit illiterate who cannot help flirting with any attractive woman he sees in his way. Félix (Antonio Resines) is a psychiatrist, very much analytic and unsure, who is forced to look for alternative jobs. Alexandra Jiménez is Rebeca, a cultured woman who has seen herself forced to work as a waitress after her father went bankrupt.

Cameos
Cheers had guest stars such as Ana Belén, José Coronado, Carolina Bang, Luis Varela, Xavier Deltell, Jaime Blanch, Sara Carbonero and Carlos Areces, among others.

References

2011 Spanish television series debuts
2012 Spanish television series endings
Spanish television sitcoms
Telecinco network series
Spanish television series based on American television series
Spanish-language television shows
2010s Spanish comedy television series